Casta may refer to:

Casta, a term used in 17th- and 18th-century Spanish America
Casta, a Spanish musical ensemble
Častá, a Slovak village
Castes in general
Casta 2E1 a Russian surveillance radar
Laetitia Casta, French model and actress
Candida albicans, skin test antigen